The Day the Music Died is a British topical music show radio comedy broadcast on BBC Radio 2.  The show aired from 2003 to 2007.  The sixth series in 2007 saw the departure of Robin Ince, leaving Jon Holmes and Andrew Collins to co-present.

External links 
 Official BBC site
 The show's myspace page
 epguides Episode List

BBC Radio 2 programmes
Day the Music Died
Day the Music Died, The